Tafara Alexander Madembo (born 26 July 2003) is a Polish professional footballer of Zimbabwean origin who plays for Orlęta Radzyń Podlaski, on loan from Wisła Kraków.

Personal life
Born in Poland, Madembo is of Zimbabwean descent.

References

2003 births
Living people
Sportspeople from Warsaw
Polish people of Zimbabwean descent
Polish footballers
Association football defenders
Wisła Kraków players